Franjo Rupnik (5 May 1921 – 25 April 2000) was a Croatian football player.

Club career
Born in Osijek, he started playing in Hajduk Osijek, before moving to Zagreb's HŠK Concordia where he played until the beginning of World War II. He had a spell at NK Zagorac Varaždin. In 1945 he moved to Belgrade's FK Partizan where he stayed until 1947 and won the Yugoslav championship. Then in 1947, he returned to Osijek to play in Proleter until 1951, one of the predecessors of today's NK Osijek.  After retiring, he became a youth coach at NK Osijek.

International career
He played a total of six matches for the Yugoslavia national football team. His debut was in 1946 in Belgrade against Czechoslovakia (a 4–2 win), and his last match was in 1950, also in Belgrade, against Norway (a 4–0 win) scoring in that match his only goal for the national team.

Honours
Partizan
Yugoslav First League: 1946–47

References

External links
 

1921 births
2000 deaths
Sportspeople from Osijek
Association football midfielders
Croatian footballers
Yugoslav footballers
Yugoslavia international footballers
HŠK Concordia players
FK Partizan players
NK Osijek players
Yugoslav First League players
Burials at Saint Anne Cemetery